Archibald Acheson may refer to one of a number of British noblemen:

 Sir Archibald Acheson, 1st Baronet (1583–1634), Scottish jurist
 Archibald Acheson, 1st Viscount Gosford (1718–1790), British politician, great-grandson of the first Baronet
 Archibald Acheson, 2nd Earl of Gosford (1776–1849), British politician and Governor-General of British North America, grandson of the first Viscount
 Archibald Acheson, 3rd Earl of Gosford (1806–1864), son of the second Earl
 Archibald Acheson, 4th Earl of Gosford (1841–1922), son of the third Earl
 Archibald Acheson, 5th Earl of Gosford (1877–1954), son of the fourth Earl
 Archibald Acheson, 6th Earl of Gosford (1911–1966), son of the fifth Earl